= Southern Styria =

Southern Styria may refer to:

- Southern part of Styria, Austria
- Southern part of Styria, Slovenia
